Ted "Kid" Lewis (born Gershon Mendeloff; 28 October 1894 – 20 October 1970) was an English professional boxer who twice won the World Welterweight Championship (147 lb). Lewis is often ranked among the all-time greats, with ESPN ranking him 41st on their list of the 50 Greatest Boxers of All-Time and boxing historian Bert Sugar placing him 46th in his Top 100 Fighters catalogue. Statistical boxing website BoxRec ranks Lewis as the 17th best welterweight of all-time and the 7th best UK boxer ever. He is a member of the International Jewish Sports Hall of Fame, the Ring Magazine Hall of Fame, and the International Boxing Hall of Fame.

Boxing career

Career beginnings 
Lewis was born as Gershon Mendeloff in a gas-lit tenement in the now demolished Umberston Street, in the Aldgate Pump section of London's East End. His father was a cabinet-maker. One of his elder brothers had become a boxer under the name of Lou Lewis.  At the suggestion of a police officer – who had witnessed his performance in a street brawl – he entered the boxing ring in 1909, making his fighting debut as 'Kid' Lewis, having joined as a member of the Judaean Club, Whitechapel (the name "Ted" was added later, in America). He subsequently won the club's Flyweight title and took home a cup of imitation silver.

He became a professional boxer in 1909. On 6 October 1913, Lewis won the British Featherweight Championship with a 17th-round knockout of Alec Lambert at London's National Sporting Club. A year later, on 2 February 1914, at London's Premierland (in Whitechapel), he won the European Featherweight title from the French boxer Paul Til via a 12th round foul. Still in 1914, campaigning as a lightweight and welterweight, Lewis left London and toured Australia. In 1915 Lewis travelled to the United States, fighting Phil Bloom in New York's Madison Square Garden and winning by a decision.

Taking the world welterweight title; rivalry with Jack Britton 

In Boston's Armory, on 31 August of that same year, he fought the man known as the "Boxing Marvel," Jack Britton, for the Welterweight title. Lewis won in a twelve-round decision, becoming World Welterweight Champion and beginning an historic rivalry. Lewis became the first English boxer to cross the Atlantic and beat an American for a world title. This victory made him one of the youngest world champions in history at the age of 21 or 22 depending on the source.

The fights between Lewis and Britton for the world title were particularly notable. Their relationship has been described as one of the greatest rivalries in boxing history, and it was said that 'they winced and ducked every time they heard the other man's name'. From 1915 to 1921 Lewis and Britton fought 20 times, a total of 224 rounds.

On 24 April 1916, in New Orleans, Lewis lost the title to Britton. He reclaimed it on 25 June 1917, at Westwood Field, Dayton, Ohio. He lost the title for the last time on 17 March 1919, in Canton, Ohio, when Britton knocked him out in the 9th round – the only knockout of the series. The roundup of his matches with Britton:  Lewis won 3, lost 4, and had 1 draw. There were 12 no decisions. After his last loss to Britton, Lewis returned to England.

Taking the British and European welterweight titles 
On 9 June 1920, at London's Olympia Exhibition Centre, he beat Johnny Basham to win the British and European Welterweight titles. He relinquished these in December of that year due to difficulty in making the weight. His drive to fight Georges Carpentier, World and European Light Heavyweight Champion, came to fruition on 11 May 1922, in the Olympia. Lewis, fighting at 150 pounds to Carpentier's 175, spent most of the first round giving the heavier man a drubbing. Then referee Joe Palmer put a hand on Lewis's shoulder to warn him against holding. Carpentier took advantage of this distraction and sneaked in a vicious right. The Kid went crashing to the canvas and was counted out. The Olympia crowd erupted furiously, crying, "foul," but to no avail. The Kid remained nonplussed. "I felt cheated, but I didn’t bear any grudge," he would later say.

Taking the British and European middleweight titles 
On 6 June 1922, at Holland Park Rink, London, Lewis knocked out Frankie Burns to win the British Middleweight title. On 11 November the same year, also at Holland Park Rink, he beat Roland Todd to win the European Middleweight title. He did not hold either title long, losing both at the Royal Albert Hall on 15 February 1923 after a gruelling rematch with Todd.

Lewis won his last two titles, the British and European Welterweight crowns, on 3 July 1924 – again at London's Royal Albert Hall – by defeating Johnny Brown. Two years later, on 26 November 1924, at Waverley Market Hall in Edinburgh, he lost these championships to the much younger Scotsman, Tommy Milligan. He continued boxing until 1929, adding 20 more fights.

His final record counting newspaper decisions was: 299 bouts, 233 won, 41 lost, 25 draws, 65 no decisions, 80 knockouts. Lewis started his career as an evasive, defensive boxer with a long left. During the six years he spent in America he changed his style radically, becoming a very aggressive, swarming, combination boxer-fighter.

Life after boxing 

In 1929 Lewis fought the last of nearly 300 career bouts in Hoxton, London, winning by a knockout. Over the course of his career, he had lost only 41 times. He then announced his retirement from boxing and settled back in his native east London.

His success in America had also made Lewis very famous at home in the UK and he had become an international celebrity. He met his future wife Elsie Schneider in New York, and became a close friend of Charlie Chaplin, who would act as godfather to Lewis' son Morton. Lewis tried his hand in the movies, predominantly tackling boxing pictures. Inevitably, he was typecast: not only was Lewis best known as a fighter, he also looked like one, with many years of punishment having left their mark on his face.

Much to the dismay of friends and family, he later acted as a bodyguard for Oswald Mosley's New Party and was also persuaded to stand in the 1931 general election as a candidate for the party in his local Whitechapel and St Georges constituency; he polled only 154 votes. However, Lewis fell out with Mosley when his subsequent political movement, the British Union of Fascists revealed itself as openly anti-Semitic. After the defeat of 1931, Mosley embraced European-style fascism and founded the British Union of Fascists in 1932. Among other things, this saw him move towards more open anti-Semitism, particularly in Lewis' native East London. In his biography of his father, Morton Lewis describes how he was taken along by his father when he went to quit Mosley's movement. It involves Lewis violently arguing with Mosley and a pair of his henchmen at their headquarters, leaving the former reeling on the ground and the other two out cold. Then, after leaving, Lewis is described as returning to the building on a whim and knocking out two more of Mosley's guards without provocation.

Restless in his career choices, he worked as a boxing trainer and manager, a gambling bookmaker, a haberdasher, a purveyor of wines and spirits, a boxing referee, a security officer, a travel agent and he also made numerous personal appearances, trading on his celebrity.  He stayed married to his wife Elsie for forty-five years until her death.

During the early 1960s, Lewis was befriended by the notorious Kray twins; the boxing-infatuated gangland bosses enjoyed bringing the famous old champion to their parties and charity evenings, and they even used him as a decoy when arranging the escape of a fellow criminal from Dartmoor prison.

In his final years, after his wife died, he was afflicted with failing eyesight and Parkinson's disease. From 1966 he lived comfortably in a south London retirement home for the Jewish elderly, Nightingale House in Clapham. He died there in October 1970. In 2003, an English Heritage blue plaque was erected at Nightingale House in his honour, which was unveiled by his son, Morton.

Further reading 
Bert Randolph Sugar, The 100 Greatest Boxers of all Time, 1984, A Rutledge Book published by Bonanza, Crown Publishers, pp. 88–89.
Nat Fleischer and Sam Andre, updated by Dan Rafael, An Illustrated History of Boxing, 2001 Edition, Citadel Press, pp. 262, 264, 265.
Morton Lewis, Ted "Kid" Lewis, His Life and Times, 1990, Robson Books, LTD, Great Britain.

Professional boxing record
All information in this section is derived from BoxRec, unless otherwise stated.

Official record

All newspaper decisions are officially regarded as “no decision” bouts and are not counted in the win/loss/draw column.

Unofficial record

Record with the inclusion of newspaper decisions in the win/loss/draw column.

See also 
List of welterweight boxing champions
List of select Jewish boxers

References

External links

Cyber Boxing Zone - Ted "Kid" Lewis
IBHOF Bio - Ted Kid Lewis

|-

|-

1894 births
1970 deaths
English male boxers
English Jews
European Boxing Union champions
Featherweight boxers
International Boxing Hall of Fame inductees
Jewish boxers
Boxers from Greater London
Welterweight boxers
World boxing champions
World welterweight boxing champions
Jewish British sportspeople